Ron James (5 November 1970 – 1 January 1990) was an Australian rules footballer who played with Footscray in the Victorian Football League (VFL) during the late 1980s.

James started his senior career at the age of just 14, when Williamstown coach Terry Wheeler picked him for the 1985 VFA Grand Final, despite having spent the entire season in the Under-19s. The club lost the match by six points but James was a member of their 1986 premiership team.

Affectionately known as Ronnie, he joined Footscray in 1987 but struggled to establish a place for himself in the team, managing only 16 games in three seasons. He kicked a goal on debut in a loss to Carlton but was overall inaccurate during his VFL career, with 16 behinds to go with his six goals. A rover, James received his only Brownlow Medal vote for his 17 disposals in a win over the Brisbane Bears at Western Oval in 1988.

At the age of 19, James was killed in a water skiing accident near Echuca on New Year's Day 1990. He had been skiing with two friends on the Murray River and was flung into a tree. Wheeler, his former coach at Williamstown, had joined Footscray for the 1990 AFL season and was later quoted as saying James could have been a 150 or 200 game player.

References 

1970 births
Western Bulldogs players
Williamstown Football Club players
Australian rules footballers from Victoria (Australia)
Accidental deaths in Victoria (Australia)
1990 deaths
Skiing deaths